Charles T. Stanton, born in Stonington, Connecticut on November 30, 1839, was the fourteenth Adjutant General of the State of Connecticut.  From 1869 to 1875 Stanton was engaged in a sugar raising in Louisiana. Then he returned to Connecticut and was appointed collector of customs for the district of Stonington.

Military career
In 1862 he raised a company for service in the Civil War, was chosen its Captain and joined the 21st Reg. Connecticut Volunteer.  Stanton was promoted to Major on 25 July 1864 and was discharged on 14 September 1864 on account of disability from wounds he received in action.  In 1866 Charles T. Stanton was appointed Connecticut Adjutant General serving until 1867. Charles T. Stanton was brevetted Major and Lieutenant-Colonel. Charles T. Stanton did an excellent service as Adjutant General and was remembered by many citizens who were interested in the organizations of the National Guard after the Civil War.

Personal life
Stanton parents were Charles Thompson Stanton and Nancy Lord Palmer. Stanton had 8 brothers and sisters; Samuel Rossiter Stanton (1838-1891), Hannah Palmer Stanton (1841-1886), Adelaide Palmer Stanton (1844-1931), Grace Noyes Stanton (1847-1891), Juliet Fanning Stanton (1847-1891), Joseph Warren Stanton (1851-1891), Nathaniel Palmer Stanton (1851-1891), and a half-brother on his father’s side. Charles went to University of Yale in 1857 and graduated in 1861. Charles T. Stanton was an excellent rower at Yale, where he and his team won the college regatta in 1859. No college crew from that day to this was more celebrated in the college world or in the professional rowing world.

References

Military personnel from Connecticut
Connecticut Adjutant Generals
1839 births
1891 deaths